This is a list of footballers who have made between 1 and 24 competitive appearances for Oldham Athletic A.F.C. since the club joined the football league in 1907.

References

Players
 
Oldham Athletic
Association football player non-biographical articles